Bostadsutskottet (English: Housing Committee) (BoU) was a parliamentary committee in the Swedish Riksdag up until 2006. The committee prepared, among other things, policies about housing and about land tenure, dwelling policies, water law, planning of buildings, physical planning, property development and surveying, as well as matters concerning the national administrative division and such municipal issues that do not belong to any other committee's preparation area.

On 1 October 2006, the committee was assimilated, along with the Law Committee, into the Civil Affairs Committee.

The last Speaker of the committee was Ragnwi Marcelind for the Christian Democrats serving from 2004 until 2006.

List of speakers for the committee

See also

References

Notes 
 Bostadsutskottet (BoU) (archived) riksdagen.se (original) 11 December 2005

Defunct standing committees of the Riksdag